Bardepur is a small village on National Highway 105 (Darbhanga to Jainagar) in India. It is located in the Kaluahi Block in the Madhubani District of the Indian state of Bihar.

Geographically it is surrounded by a small and seasonal stream that is considered by the locals to be an origin point of the Jeevachh river. The primary languages spoken in Bardepur are Maithili, Hindi, and Urdu. It is located 18 km north of Madhubani, 4 km from Kaluahi, and 159 km from Patna. The nearest train station to the village is in Jainagar.

The village used to be well known for its cattle market, which led to it receiving the nickname Baradaha, derived from Baradahaat. The first syllable of Baredepur, Barde, is derived from this. The second syllable, pur, is the Sanskrit word for village or town.

As of the census of 2001, the population of this village was 2000(approx).

References

Villages in Madhubani  district